Acacia plectocarpa is a tree or shrub belonging to the genus Acacia and the subgenus Juliflorae that is endemism to north western Australia.

Description
The often spindly tree or shrub typically grows to a height of  but can reach up to  It usually has a single stem with flakey or fissured bark that is grey to black in colour. The glabrous angular branchlets are yellowish to brown in colour and usually resinous. Like most species of Acacia it has phyllodes rather than leaves. The thinly coriaceous, glabrous and evergreen phyllodes have a linear to narrowly elliptic shape and are flat and stright to slightly curved. It blooms from March to June producing yellow flowers.

Distribution
It is native to a large area in the Northern Territory and the Kimberley region of Western Australia where it is found to grow in a variety of habitats.

See also
List of Acacia species

References

plectocarpa
Acacias of Western Australia
Flora of the Northern Territory
Taxa named by George Bentham
Plants described in 1842
Flora of Queensland